Panayotis Panagopoulos (15 August 1916 – 1999) was a Greek chess player, Greek Chess Championship winner (1957).

Biography
In the 1950s Panayotis Panagopoulos was one of Greek leading chess players. In 1957, he won Greek Chess Championship.

Panayotis Panagopoulos played for Greece in the Chess Olympiads:
 In 1950, at second board in the 9th Chess Olympiad in Dubrovnik (+0, =2, -10),
 In 1954, at third board in the 11th Chess Olympiad in Amsterdam (+5, =7, -6),
 In 1958, at third board in the 13th Chess Olympiad in Munich (+4, =5, -7).

References

External links

Panayotis Panagopoulos chess games at 365chess.com

1916 births
Year of death missing
Greek chess players
Chess Olympiad competitors
20th-century Greek people